The Malaysian Democratic Party (MDP) was a political party in Malaysia formed by Wee Choo Keong in 1998, after he was expelled from Democratic Action Party (DAP) due to his fall-out and failed revolt against then secretary-general Lim Kit Siang.

MDP contested both the 1999 and 2004 general elections but failed to win any seats. Wee himself, who was the party secretary-general, even lost his deposit after contesting the Bukit Bintang parliamentary seat in 2004. He later entered the 2008 general elections on the Parti Keadilan Rakyat (PKR) ticket and won. Since then, MDP has become inactive even though Wee was dropped for the 2013 general elections.

General election results

See also
List of political parties in Malaysia
Politics of Malaysia
Parti Keadilan Rakyat (PKR)
Pakatan Rakyat

External links
Wee Choo Keong Wordpress
Wee Choo Keong Blogspot inactive.

References

Articles with imported Creative Commons Attribution-ShareAlike 3.0 text
Political parties established in 1998
Political parties in Malaysia
1998 establishments in Malaysia